Koja e Kuçit (Koja of Kuçi) is a historical Albanian tribe and region in Malësia. Koja is a Catholic region located between Triepshi and Kuči. The people of Koja are referred to as Kojanë or Koqas.

History 

Koja is the smallest region in Malësia. It is attested for the first time in the Ottoman defter of 1582 where the villages of Koqa i Madh and Koqa i Vogël appear in the nahiyah of Kuçi. These settlements were not recorded in the previous registers suggesting that their founding can be attributed to an increase in population, possibly due to migrations, that occurred following the consolidation of Ottoman power in the region. In regards to their anthroponymy, over half of the inhabitants of these villages bore typical Albanian personal names, the remainder bearing mixed Albanian-Slavic anthroponyms. In the Montenegrin–Ottoman War (1861–62), Kuči, Piperi and other groups attacked Triepshi and Koja e Kuçit, but that attack was repulsed. Pretash Zeka Ulaj from Koja was one of the Malësor leaders that led the region to its freedom when fighting in 1911 in the Battle of Deçiq, alongside the famous Ded Gjo Luli from Hoti. Dokë Preci Krcaj, Cakë Uci Ivanaj, Gjeto Toma Kolçaj, Tomë Uci Ivanaj, Kolë Doka Marashaj, Marash Leca Gjokaj, and Gjeto Gjeka Ivanaj are remembered as the Seven Heroes of Koja for giving their lives in the battle.

Brotherhoods and families 
Koja e Kuçit became part of Montenegro in 1880. The surnames are given both in their original Albanian form and the Montenegrin equivalent that was required by the authorities that the people of Koja adopt in that era.

 Ulaj:   - Flag-bearers (Bajraktarët) of the tribe.
 Kolçaj:  - Descendants of the Marashaj.  Notable people include ; Gjeto Toma Kolçaj.
 Nucullaj:  - Descendants of Pal Nika from Selcë. Nikaj and Pajaj descend from the Nucullaj tribe. They originate from the Kastrati clan but had migrated to Selcë in Kelmend before going to Kojë.
 Marashaj
 Perkaj 
 Ivanaj: Several descendants immigrated to Plav-Guci
 Lucaj
 Kërcaj:

Descendants of the Gorvokaj tribe. Several descendants immigrated to Plav-Guci
 Gjokaj
 Gjeloshaj: Part of Bakaj brotherhood. First and original tribe to inhabit Koja e Kuçit. Notable people include ; Toma Lulashi Gjeloshaj.
 Gorvokaj:  - Krcaj (brotherhood descends from the Gorvokaj. Originally from Vukël in Kelmendi.
 Nikaj: Descendants of Nikë  of the Nucullaj tribe.
 Pali: Originally from Berishë (Berisha E kuqe) near Puka migrated to Koja in the 1500s. Descendants can be found in Ana Malit, Kelmend, Plav — Guci and Shkodër

Notable people
 Pretash Zeka Ulaj —Leader of the tribe volunteers at the Battle of Deçiq.
 Gjeto Toma Kolçaj — Participant at the Battle of Deçiq.
 Viktor Marku Ula — International relations scholar and Political Advisory to former Kosovo Prime Minister Agim Çeku in 2006.

References 

Albanian communities in Montenegro
Malësia
Albanian Roman Catholics
Historical regions in Albania
Tribes of Albania